Light of the World is an album by the Poor Clares of Arundel, a community of nuns in England. It consists of plainchant Latin medieval texts set to music by composers James Morgan and Juliette Pochin.
The album debuted at number one in the UK Classical music chart in October 2020, a position it has retained for 19 weeks.

References

2020s classical albums
2020 albums
Poor Clares